Acanthosaura is a genus of lizards, commonly known as mountain horned dragons or pricklenape agamas, in the family Agamidae. The common name "pricklenape" refers to a row of dorsal spines which runs down the back of the neck. They are arboreal lizards found in Southeast Asia. As the common name "mountain horned dragons" implies, they tend to prefer higher elevation areas with dense vegetation.

Diet
Mountain horned dragons are insectivorous, consuming only live food. Common foods in captivity include crickets, earthworms, silkworms, mealworms, moths, roaches, wax worms, and grasshoppers. They require a variety in diet and will often refuse food when offered in excessive redundancy.

Typical Acanthosaura feeding behavior is a sit-and-wait style. A display of aerobatics is not uncommon from Acanthosaura species when hunting food. They will eat and hunt fish, but most will not submerge their heads to catch a meal.

Reproduction
Females of the genus Acanthosaura lay their first clutch of eggs about four months after mating. They may lay up to four clutches total per year, separated by a month or two.

In captivity
Mountain horned dragons are popular pets, and readily available in the exotic pet trade. A. capra is considered the hardiest and most easily kept species of the genus, and is the most common species found for sale in the United States.  While not considered to be difficult to breed in captivity, most specimens available are wild caught.
However, due to captive breeding, more and more captive bred lizards are available.

Species
Acanthosaura armata  – armored pricklenape, peninsular horned tree lizard – Burma, China, Indonesia, Malaysia, Thailand
Acanthosaura aurantiacrista  – Thailand
Acanthosaura bintangensis  – Bukit Larut Mountain horned agamid, Bintang horned tree lizard – Perak, Peninsular Malaysia
Acanthosaura brachypoda  – Vietnam
Acanthosaura capra  – green pricklenape  – Cambodia, Laos, Vietnam
Acanthosaura cardamomensis  – western Cambodia, eastern Thailand
Acanthosaura coronata  – crowned spiny lizard - Vietnam
Acanthosaura crucigera  – Boulenger's pricklenape, masked horned tree lizard – Burma, Cambodia, Malaysia, Thailand, Vietnam
Acanthosaura lepidogaster  – brown pricklenape  – Burma, Cambodia, China, Thailand, Vietnam
Acanthosaura liui  – China
Acanthosaura longicaudata  – long-tailed horned tree lizard, long-tailed horned agamid – China
Acanthosaura meridiona 
Acanthosaura murphyi  – Central Vietnam
Acanthosaura nataliae  – Vietnam
Acanthosaura phongdienensis  – Vietnam
Acanthosaura phuketensis  – Phuket horned tree agamid – southwestern Thailand
Acanthosaura prasina  – Vietnam
Acanthosaura rubrilabris  – red-lipped horned tree lizard, red-lipped horned agamid – China
Acanthosaura titiwangsaensis  – Malayan Mountain horned agamid, Titiwangsa horned tree lizard – Fraser's Hill and Cameron Highlands, Pahang, and Peninsular Malaysia
Acanthosaura tongbiguanensis  – China

Gallery

References

Acanthosaura
Reptiles of Southeast Asia
Lizard genera
Taxa named by John Edward Gray